Lee Kan (born 22 February 1962) is a Hong Kong judoka. He competed at the 1988 Summer Olympics and the 1992 Summer Olympics.

References

External links
 

1962 births
Living people
Hong Kong male judoka
Olympic judoka of Hong Kong
Judoka at the 1988 Summer Olympics
Judoka at the 1992 Summer Olympics
Place of birth missing (living people)